St. Andrew's is a private, Episcopal, co-educational 100% boarding school in New Castle County, Delaware, with a Middletown postal address.

History
St. Andrew's was founded in 1929 by A. Felix du Pont (1879–1948). He was a member of the du Pont family. The school was founded to provide a top education for boys of all socio-economic backgrounds, regardless of their families' ability to pay. St. Andrew's was originally a boys' school, but became coeducational in 1973.

Film appearances
The 1989 film Dead Poets Society starring Robin Williams was filmed almost entirely on the school grounds. The school was known as Welton Academy in the movie.

It also served as the filming location of the young President Bartlet's boarding school in the television series The West Wing episode entitled "Two Cathedrals" (number 44).

Notable alumni

Bulent Atalay (1958) – physicist and author
Ben Bentil (2014) – Professional basketball player for Boston Celtics
Dennis C. Blair (1964) – former Director of National Intelligence for President Barack Obama and former United States Navy four-star admiral
Eric Boateng (2005) – British Olympian, member of the British Olympic Association's Athletes' Commission, professional basketball player, former center for Arizona State Sun Devils, 2005 McDonald's All-American and Gatorade State Athlete of the Year
William R. Brownfield (1970) – Assistant Secretary of State; United States Ambassador to Chile, Venezuela, Colombia
Erin Burnett (1994) – host of Erin Burnett OutFront on CNN
Gardner Cadwalader (1966) – Olympic rower, competed in the men's coxed four event at the 1968 Summer Olympics
Moira Forbes (1997) – Publisher of ForbesWoman
Roy Foster (1967) – Irish academic, educator and historical writer
Terrell L. Glenn Jr. (1976) — American Anglican bishop
Gregory Gourdet (1993) – Top Chef season 12 runner-up
Hume Horan (1951) –  diplomat and ambassador to five countries
Doug James (1969) – American songwriter, known for "How Am I Supposed to Live Without You"
Lydia Kiesling (2001) - American author and literary critic
Chris Klebl (1990) – cross-country skier, 11-time U.S. National Champion, Paralympic Gold Medalist
Will McCormack (1992) — actor and Oscar-winning Filmmaker 
Steven Naifeh (1970) – Pulitzer Prize-winning author and artist
Janice Nevin (1977) - President and CEO of ChristianaCare
Maggie Rogers (2012) — Grammy-nominated musician, singer-songwriter, and producer
Peter Salett (1987) –  singer/songwriter and composer
John Seabrook (1976) –  author and journalist for The New Yorker
Dominic Seiterle (1994) – Canadian rower, Olympic Gold Medalist
Scott Siprelle (1981) – venture capitalist and 2010 Republican candidate for Congress in New Jersey's 12th congressional district
Cristina Stenbeck Fitzgibbons (1995) – Swedish-American businesswoman
Kirk Varnedoe (1963) – American art historian and writer
Loudon Wainwright Jr. (1942)– Life magazine columnist
Loudon Wainwright III (1965) –  songwriter, folk singer, humorist, and actor
George Welch (1936) – test pilot, medal of honor nominee
William H. Whyte (1935) – sociologist, author of The Organization Man

References

External links

Boarding schools in Delaware
High schools in New Castle County, Delaware
Private high schools in Delaware
Educational institutions established in 1929
Episcopal schools in the United States
Middletown, Delaware
1929 establishments in Delaware